The 1895–96 FA Cup was the 25th season of the world's oldest association football competition, the Football Association Challenge Cup (more usually known as the FA Cup). The cup was won by The Wednesday, who defeated Wolverhampton Wanderers 2–1 in the final of the competition, played at Crystal Palace in London. This was Wednesday's first victory in the FA Cup.

Matches were scheduled to be played at the stadium of the team named first on the date specified for each round, which was always a Saturday. If scores were level after 90 minutes had been played, a replay would take place at the stadium of the second-named team later the same week. If the replayed match was drawn further replays would be held at neutral venues until a winner was determined. If scores were level after 90 minutes had been played in a replay, a 30-minute period of extra time would be played.

Calendar
The format of the FA Cup for the season had a preliminary round, four qualifying rounds, three proper rounds, and the semi finals and final.

First round proper
The First Round Proper contained sixteen ties between 32 teams. The 16 First Division sides were given a bye to this round, as were Notts County, Darwen, Burton Wanderers, Liverpool, Newton Heath and Woolwich Arsenal from the Second Division. The other Second Division sides were entered into the first qualifying round. Of those sides, only Grimsby Town, Newcastle United, Crewe Alexandra and Burton Swifts qualified to the FA Cup proper. Six non-league sides also qualified.

The matches were played on Saturday, 1 February 1896. Two matches were drawn, with the replays taking place in the following midweek.

Second round proper
The eight Second Round matches were scheduled for Saturday, 15 February 1896. There were three replays, played in the following midweek.

Third round proper
The four Third Round matches were scheduled for Saturday, 29 February 1896. There were no replays needed.

Semi-finals

The semi-final matches were both played on Saturday, 21 March 1896. The Wednesday and Wolverhampton Wanderers went on to meet in the final at Crystal Palace.

Replay

Final

The final took place on Saturday, 18 April 1896 at Crystal Palace.  Less than 50,000 supporters attended the match. The match finished 2–1 to The Wednesday, through two early goals from Fred Spiksley. Between the two goals, David Black had equalised for Wolves.

Match details

See also
FA Cup Final Results 1872-

References
General
Official site; fixtures and results service at TheFA.com
1895-1896 FA Cup at rsssf.com
1895-1896 FA Cup at soccerbase.com

Specific

1895-96
1895–96 domestic association football cups
1895–96 in English football